HMS Javelin was a J-class destroyer of the Royal Navy.

Construction and career
Javelin was laid down by John Brown and Company, Limited, at Clydebank in Scotland on 11 October 1937, launched on 21 December 1938, and commissioned on 10 June 1939 with the pennant number F61.

At the end of November 1940 the 5th Destroyer Flotilla, consisting of HMS Jupiter, Javelin, Jackal, Jersey, and Kashmir, under Captain Lord Louis Mountbatten, was operating off Plymouth, England. The flotilla engaged the German destroyers Hans Lody, Richard Beitzen, and Karl Galster. Javelin was badly damaged by gunfire and torpedoes fired by the German destroyers, losing both her bow and her stern. Only  of Javelins original  length remained afloat and she was towed back to harbour. Javelin was out of action for almost a year. Probably arising from this incident, Stoker First Class T Robson was killed and is interred at St Pol de Leon Cemetery, Brittany, France.

Javelin participated in the Operation Ironclad assault on Madagascar in May 1942.

She participated in the failed Operation Vigorous attempt to deliver a supply convoy to Malta, in June 1942. Javelin along with  destroyed a flotilla of Italian small ships on the night of 19 January 1943.

Javelin record was marred on 17 October 1945 whilst off Rhodes  by an outbreak of indiscipline (a refusal to work by “Hostilities Only” ratings following resentment over a return to pre-war spit-and-polish): one leading rating was charged with mutiny, and several ratings were subsequently court-martialled, though sentences were reduced as the facts became known.

Javelin was sold to the shipbreakers on 11 June 1949, and she was scrapped at Troon in Scotland.

See also
Henry Leach (navigating officer during mutiny; more details at Leach biographic article)

Notes

References

 
 
 
 
 
 
 
 
 
 

 

1938 ships
Ships built on the River Clyde
J, K and N-class destroyers of the Royal Navy
Maritime incidents in November 1940
Royal Navy mutinies
World War II destroyers of the United Kingdom